Clavulinopsis is a genus of coral fungi in the family Clavariaceae. The genus, first described scientifically by Casper van Overeem in 1923, has a widespread distribution.

The name means "having the appearance of Clavulina".

Species

, Index Fungorum lists 67 valid species in Clavulinopsis:

C. alcicornis
C. amoena
C. antillarum
C. appalachiensis
C. archeri
C. arctica
C. arenicola
C. aurantia
C. aurantiobrunnea
C. aurantiocinnabarina
C. boninensis
C. brevipes
C. candida
C. carneola
C. cinnamomea
C. cirrata
C. citrinoalba
C. coliformis
C. corallinorosacea
C. corniculata (edible)
C. depokensis
C. daigremontiana
C. depokensis
C. dichotoma
C. fleischeriana
C. fruticula
C. fusiformis
C. graveolens
C. griseola
C. helvola
C. hexaspora
C. hisingeri
C. hexaspora
C. laeticolor
C. ledermannii
C. lignicola
C. liguloides
C. lingula
C. luteo-ochracea
C. luteoalba
C. luteonana
C. luticola
C. michelii
C. miyabeana
C. moricolor
C. ochracea
C. propera
C. punicea
C. pusilla
C. rufipes
C. semivestita
C. septentrionalis
C. sibutiana
C. solomonensis
C. spathuliformis
C. spiculosa
C. spiralis
C. subarctica
C. subfastigiata
C. subflava
C. subumbrinella
C. sulcata
C. sulphurascens
C. tenella
C. tenerrima
C. tetragona
C. umbrina
C. umbrinella
C. yakusimensis

See also
List of Agaricales genera

References

External links

Clavariaceae
Agaricales genera